Ingi of Sweden - English also: Ingold ; Swedish: Inge or Yngve or Ingjald - may refer to (chronologically):

Yngvi, mythological Swedish ruler, also known as Yngve Freyr
Yngvi, legendary Swedish ruler
Ingold Illready, semi-legendary Swedish ruler
Inge the Elder, King of Sweden 1079
Inge the Younger, King of Sweden 1118